Emily Beausoleil is a Canadian political theorist and lecturer of political science at the Victorian University of Wellington. She is the co-editor of the academic journal Democratic Theory along with Jean-Paul Gagnon.

Beausoleil has an h-index of 7.

In 2021 Beausoleil was awarded the Early Career Research Excellence Award for Social Sciences by the Royal Society Te Apārangi.

Education
PhD (Political Theory)
University of British Columbia, Vancouver, Canada
MA (English Literature)
University of British Columbia, Vancouver, Canada
Bachelor of Humanities (Highest Hons)
Carleton University, Ottawa, Canada

References 

American political philosophers
American women philosophers
Lecturers
Living people
Year of birth missing (living people)
Place of birth missing (living people)
Academic staff of the Victoria University of Wellington
21st-century American women
21st-century American philosophers